Tetrakis(dimethylamino)titanium (TDMAT) is a chemical compound. The compound is generally classified as a metalorganic species, meaning that its properties are strongly influenced by the organic ligands but the compound lacks metal-carbon bonds. It is used in chemical vapor deposition to prepare titanium nitride (TiN) surfaces and in atomic layer deposition as a titanium dioxide precursor. The prefix "tetrakis" refers the presence of four of the same ligand, in this case dimethylamides.

Preparation and properties
Tetrakis(dimethylamino)titanium is a conventional Ti(IV) compound in the sense that it is tetrahedral and diamagnetic. Unlike the many alkoxides, the diorganoamides of titanium are monomeric and thus at least somewhat volatile.  It is prepared from titanium tetrachloride (which is also tetrahedral, diamagnetic, and volatile) by treatment with lithium dimethylamide:
TiCl4  +  4 LiNMe2   →   Ti(NMe2)4  +  4 LiCl
Like many amido complexes, TDMAT is quite sensitive toward water, and its handling requires air-free techniques. The ultimate products of its hydrolysis is titanium dioxide and dimethylamine:
Ti(NMe2)4  +  2 H2O   →   TiO2  +  4 HNMe2
In a related reaction, the compound undergoes exchange with other amines, evolving dimethylamine.

See also
Metalorganic chemical vapor deposition (MOCVD), general process which includes using TDMAT but also uses many other gases to layer other substances.

References

Semiconductor device fabrication
Titanium(IV) compounds
Metal amides